East Paulding High School is a public secondary school located in Dallas, Georgia, United States.

EPHS was established in 1991 and is nestled in one of the country's fastest-growing counties. The school's enrollment is approaching 1800 students.

Brad Thomason was appointed Principal during the summer of 2020.

History 
The school was founded in 1991.

In 2009, the school added a 44-classroom, two-story building, including a cosmetology lab and a new band room, nearly doubling the school's capacity. In June 2017, a fire destroyed the gymnasium while contractors were repairing the school's HVAC system and roof.

United States Air Force Junior Reserve Officers' Training Corps (JROTC) 
The EPHS Air Force Junior ROTC Drill Team is the 2010 Air Force Nationals Unarmed Eastern Division Champions. The Junior ROTC Drill Team is also the 2014 National High School Drill Team Champion in the Armed and Unarmed divisions.

Previous Drill Team archived files found in wrong section:

Fine and Performing Arts
East Paulding has multiple fine arts programs including Visual Arts, Drama, Band, and Chorus.

The EPHS Theatre Company's one-act play "Epic Proportions" was the GHSA Region 7-AAAAA Champion in 2012.  The EPHS Theatre Hall of Fame 2002-2015 under the direction of Grant Brown.

Notable alumni

 Chas Henry - punter, Philadelphia Eagles; played college football at the University of Florida.
 Zachary Wheeler (class of 2009) -  pitcher, Philadelphia Phillies; former first round draft pick of San Francisco Giants.

References 

 History
 Memorable Faculty
 Athletics
 Newsletter

External links
School website

Educational institutions established in 1991
Public high schools in Georgia (U.S. state)
Schools in Paulding County, Georgia
1991 establishments in Georgia (U.S. state)